Léonore Baulac (born 10 May 1990) is a French ballet dancer. She is an étoile at the Paris Opera Ballet.

Early life
Baulac was born in Paris to a Norwegian-born mother. When Baulac was ten, she did not participate in the entrance exam to the Paris Opera Ballet School. She only decided to pursue a career in ballet a year later, but could not enter the school at that time as she was too old. Therefore, she trained with a private teacher. At age 13, she started training at Conservatoire de Paris. She learned contemporary dance there. In 2005, at age 15, Baulac finally entered Paris Opera Ballet School as a paying student.

Career
In 2008, Baulac joined the Paris Opera Ballet's corps de ballet. She only had a handful of opportunities during her first few years in the company. She also danced with Samuel Murez's 3e étage. In 2014, when she was considering leaving the company, she was promoted to coryphée. She was trained by Aurélie Dupont for her coryphée exam. Benjamin Millepied became the artistic director later that year, and Baulac was immediately cast in The Nutcracker. She was promoted to sujet in 2015 and première danseuse a year later. In 2016, Baulac was assigned to understudy Odette/Odile in Swan Lake, and replaced an injured dancer on 31 December. After her performance, Dupont, now the artistic director, promoted Baulac to étoile on stage. She has danced roles such as Kitri in Don Quixote, Juliet in Romeo and Juliet and The Sylph in La Sylphide. She also created roles for William Forsythe's Blake Works I and Crystal Pite's Body and Soul.

Selected repertoire
Baulac's repertoire with the Paris Opera Ballet includes:

References

Paris Opera Ballet étoiles
Living people
1989 births
21st-century French ballet dancers
Conservatoire de Paris alumni
French ballerinas
French people of Norwegian descent
Prima ballerinas